Henry Colville (12 February 1924 – 16 March 1999) was a Scottish football player and manager.

He played for Falkirk, Raith Rovers, Chester and Dunfermline Athletic. After retiring as a player in 1960, Colville managed Cowdenbeath from then until 1964.

References

External links 
 

1924 births
1999 deaths
Footballers from Kirkcaldy
Association football central defenders
Scottish footballers
Falkirk F.C. players
Raith Rovers F.C. players
Chester City F.C. players
Dunfermline Athletic F.C. players
Scottish Football League players
English Football League players
Scottish football managers
Cowdenbeath F.C. managers
Scottish Football League managers